St. Aignan's trumpet-eared bat (Kerivoula agnella) is a species of vesper bat in the family Vespertilionidae.
It is found only in Papua New Guinea, and is only endemic to the islands, not the mainland. The species has been recorded on the islands of Fergusson, Vanatinai, Woodlark, and Misima.
Its natural habitat is subtropical or tropical dry forests.

References

Kerivoulinae
Bats of Oceania
Endemic fauna of Papua New Guinea
Mammals of Papua New Guinea
Vulnerable fauna of Oceania
Taxa named by Oldfield Thomas
Mammals described in 1908
Taxonomy articles created by Polbot
Bats of New Guinea